Polyptychoides niloticus is a moth of the family Sphingidae. It is found from Zambia to Sudan, Ethiopia and Somalia.

This species is subject to considerable seasonal and climatic variation. Extreme dry season specimens and specimens from arid areas are very small, sandy, with all markings faint or obsolete and more regular wing margins. Specimens from moister areas, or taken in the wet season are consistently larger, darker grey, more heavily marked and have scalloped wing margins. Both forms may occur in the same areas.

The length of the forewings is 28–43 mm for males and 34–52 for females. The ground colour is grey with a black basal dot. The antemedial, postmedial and submarginal lines are straight and clearly defined. The hindwings are grey, but darker near the inner margin. In the extreme dry form (niloticus) the ground colour is pale sandy.

Subspecies
Polyptychoides niloticus niloticus
Polyptychoides niloticus ponens Pierre, 1989 (Tchad)

References

Polyptychoides
Moths described in 1921
Insects of Ethiopia
Fauna of Somalia
Fauna of Zambia
Moths of Africa